Tensoku Rock is an exposed rock lying on the coast, midway between Flattunga and Tama Glacier in Queen Maud Land. Mapped from surveys and air photos by Japanese Antarctic Research Expedition (JARE), 1957–62, and named Tensoku-iwa (observation rock) because the feature served as a point of observation for the JARE survey party.

Rock formations of Queen Maud Land
Prince Olav Coast